The 2000 PBA season was the 26th season of the Philippine Basketball Association (PBA).

Board of governors

Executive committee
 Emilio Bernardino, Jr. (Commissioner) 
 Wilfred Steven Uytengsu (Chairman, representing Alaska Milkmen)
 Ignatius Yenko (Vice-Chairman, representing Mobiline Phone Pals)
 Alberto Villa-Abrille, Jr. (Treasurer, representing San Miguel Beermen)

Teams

Notable occurrences
PBA's TV partner, Vintage Television was absorbed by Viva Entertainment.
Batang Red Bull Energizers entered the league as an expansion team.
Songwriter and composer Jim Paredes was commissioned by the league to compose the league's theme song, in celebration of its 25th anniversary. The song, entitled "Todo Bigay" was first performed by Regine Velasquez during the league's opening ceremonies.
The league celebrated their silver anniversary on April 9, 2000, with the awarding of the PBA's 25 greatest players.
The league forfeited Batang Red Bull's wins when 18-year-old Kerby Raymundo was found to have deficient academic credentials. He would later return to the team in 2001.
It was the year when a crackdown of alleged fake Fil-foreign cagers led to deportations of Asi Taulava and Sonny Alvarado. Eric Menk, Danny Seigle and Chris Jackson were among those suspended by the PBA.
The Bureau of Immigration and Deportation (BID) revoked the Filipino citizenship of Tanduay's Sonny Alvarado as it uncovered that the player used fraudulent papers; consequently, the BID ordered Alvarado's deportation.
Alvarado's deportation affected the season's All-Filipino Cup semifinal round after PBA commissioner Jun Bernardino forfeited two of Tanduay's semifinal wins (Games 2 and 3) against Purefoods, since Alvarado played in those games (he didn't play in the first game). With the forfeitures, the series would have resumed on Game 4 with Purefoods leading the series 2–1; however, Tanduay secured a temporary restraining order (TRO) that prevented the league from staging Game 4 of their series. This has been the first time a PBA game has been suspended via a court order.

Opening ceremonies
The muses for the participating teams are as follows:

2000 PBA All-Filipino Cup

Elimination round

Playoffs

Finals 

|}

2000 PBA Commissioner's Cup

Elimination round

Playoffs

Finals 

|}

2000 PBA Governors' Cup

Elimination round

Playoffs

Finals 

|}

ABC-PBA All-Star Game
As celebration to the league's twenty-fifth anniversary, the league and the Asian Basketball Confederation (now FIBA Asia) held the ABC-PBA All-Star Game. Controversy ensued when ABC team member Rommel Adducul (who was also playing for the Manila Metrostars of the Metropolitan Basketball Association) had to be late due to his commitments with the Metrostars. Adducul earlier played against the Pasig-Rizal Pirates, a few kilometers away from the ABC-PBA All-Star venue.

Awards
 Most Valuable Player: Danny Ildefonso (San Miguel)
 Rookie of the Year:  Davonn Harp (Red Bull)
 Sportsmanship Award: Freddie Abuda (San Miguel)
 Most Improved Player: Mark Telan (Shell)
 Defensive Player of the Year: Freddie Abuda (San Miguel)
 Mythical Five
 Danny Ildefonso (San Miguel)
 Danny Seigle (San Miguel)
 Olsen Racela (San Miguel)
 Alvin Patrimonio (Purefoods)
 Kenneth Duremdes (Alaska)
 Mythical Second Team
 Dindo Pumaren (Purefoods)
 Jeffrey Cariaso (Tanduay)
 Bong Hawkins (Alaska)
 Rudy Hatfield (Tanduay)
 Marlou Aquino (Sta. Lucia)
 All Defensive Team
 Chris Jackson (Shell)
 Freddie Abuda (San Miguel)
 Rey Evangelista (Purefoods)
 Jeffrey Cariaso (Tanduay)
 Dindo Pumaren (Purefoods)

Awards given by the PBA Press Corps
 Coach of the Year: Jong Uichico (San Miguel)
 Mr. Quality Minutes: Boybits Victoria (San Miguel)
 Executive of the Year: Buddy Encarnado (Sta. Lucia)
 Comeback Player of the Year: Ato Agustin (Red Bull)
 Referee of the Year: Ernie de Leon

Cumulative standings

References

External links
 pba.inquirer.net

 
PBA